"That's What She Gets for Loving Me" is a song written by Ronnie Dunn and Terry McBride, and recorded by American country music duo Brooks & Dunn.  It was released in February 2004 as the third and final single from their album Red Dirt Road.  It peaked at number 6 in the United States.

Chart positions
"That's What She Gets for Loving Me" debuted at number 50 on the U.S. Billboard Hot Country Singles & Tracks chart for the week of February 14, 2004.

Year-end charts

References

2004 singles
Brooks & Dunn songs
Songs written by Ronnie Dunn
Songs written by Terry McBride (musician)
Song recordings produced by Mark Wright (record producer)
Arista Nashville singles
2003 songs